Recycle Track Systems (RTS) is an environmentally-focused waste and recycling management company. RTS uses a software platform and a proprietary tracking system to provide hauling services for businesses. A patent is pending.   RTS tracks materials as they travel to recycling or composting facilities and provides companies with reports that show how much material was recycled or composted. The customer experience has been compared the app-based car service, Uber.

History 
RTS was co-founded by CEO Gregory Lettieri and COO Adam Pasquale in 2014.  Pasquale is a fourth-generation member of a New York waste-hauling family, and his great-grandfather started in the garbage business with pushcarts on Mulberry Street in Manhattan's Little Italy in the early 1900s.  Lettieri is a native of Staten Island and formerly worked in technology at Bank of America. Long-time friends, the two came up with the idea for the company in 2014.
  
In June 2017, the company closed a series A financing round worth $11.7 million with Boston-based growth equity firm Volition Capital, the former U.S. team of Fidelity Ventures. Volition also provided the first outside money into Chewy, a pet supplies company that sold to PetSmart.
 
Shazi Visram is an investor and board member of Recycle Track Systems, an American entrepreneur, investor, and philanthropist, best known as the founder, CEO, and Chief Mom of Happy Family Brands. Visram is a mentor for startups and an impact venture investor, with investments in EpiBone, Ovia Health, Simple Mills and Bulletproof. 
 
Lew Frankfort, the former chairman and CEO of Coach, Inc., is also a board member.
 
RTS customers include Whole Foods, WeWork, SoulCycle, Barclays Center, Citi Field, Nationals Park and Audi Field.

Impact 
In 2018, RTS donated 17,952 square feet of wood and 27 rolls of unused synthetic snow from the NHL Winter Classic game held at Citi Field to Materials for the Arts, a Long Island City-based program of the Department of Cultural Affairs that supports non-profit organizations and public schools throughout New York City.
RTS has donated approximately 66,000 pounds of food waste for Washington Nationals in the 2018 season.
RTS is a certified B Corporation.

Awards 
RTS was honored in the Best for Environment list, based on an independent, comprehensive assessment administered by the nonprofit B Lab, the organization that certifies B Corporations.

References

Further reading 
 Notation of co-founder Pasquale's graduation from George Washington University:

External links 
 Official website

Privately held companies based in New York City
Recycling industry